Arvind Kumar Sharma (born 11 July 1962) is an Indian politician from Uttar Pradesh, Former IAS officer and Bureaucrat. He is currently the Cabinet Minister in Uttar Pradesh. Before joining politics, Sharma was an Indian Administrative Service officer from Gujarat Cadre of the 1988 batch.
Sharma is considered a close aide of Prime Minister of India Narendra Modi with whom he had worked for 20 years.  He was also CEO, Gujarat Infrastructure Development Board and has also managed multiple Vibrant Gujarat summits. He joined the Prime Minister's Office as a Joint Secretary in 2014 and was elevated to the Additional Secretary rank in 2017.
In 2019, he moved out of the PMO to become a secretary in the Ministry of Micro, Small and Medium Enterprises but took voluntary retirement in January 2021.

Early life and education 
Arvind Kumar Sharma was born in Uttar Pradesh’s Mau district in 1962 to Shri Shivmurti Sharma and Shrimati Sharma. He completed schooling from his home district before graduating from Allahabad University. He pursued a master's degree in political science before joining the civil services.

Work in Gujarat 
In 1988, Sharma became a civil servant and started his career as an IAS officer with the Gujarat cadre. His first posting was as a Sub-Divisional Magistrate (SDM). In 1995, he took charge as the District Magistrate of Mehsana. After Narendra Modi came to power in Gujarat in 2001, Sharma joined the Chief Minister’s Office as a Secretary and remained there till 2014 before shifting to the Centre. Sharma worked in the Government of Gujarat for a long duration in various positions including District Development Officer in Vadodara, Managing Director of Industrial Extension Bureau, and the CEO of Gujarat Infrastructure Development Board (GIDB). His contribution in setting up the Gujarat section of the dedicated freight corridor and Delhi-Mumbai Industrial Corridor as well as Dholera Special Investment Region was noted by the media and the government alike. Known for being a low-profile officer and a doer, Sharma is said to have coordinated the ‘Vibrant Gujarat’ Summit, a biennial investor summit that played a significant role in bringing in foreign investment to Gujarat. He is also said to have played a key role in getting the Tata Nano plant moved from Singur in West Bengal to Sanand in Gujarat in 2008. His work made him one of the closest aides of Modi.

Work in PMO 
Arvind Kumar Sharma remained as Secretary in Chief Minister’s Office till 2014 when Narendra Modi became the Prime Minister. He then joined the PMO as a Joint Secretary in 2014 and was elevated to the Additional Secretary rank in 2017. After his long stint in the PMO, Sharma was entrusted with the charge of micro, small and medium enterprises (MSME) ministry.

Voluntary Retirement and entry into politics 
Arvind Kumar Sharma sought retirement in January 2021 from civil services, 18 months before his due retirement. A few days after his voluntary retirement, Sharma joined the Bharatiya Janata Party (BJP) in Uttar Pradesh.
He gained media attention for his Covid-19 relief work in the state at a time when the daily numbers of cases and deaths were increasing rapidly.
Uttar Pradesh was severely affected in the second wave of Corona. New cases are still coming, but their numbers are decreasing. The noise of the outcry due to the virus has reduced slightly, but the situation is still to be improved upon. Amid this noise, a name is sometimes heard lightly and sometimes clearly, and the name is of Arvind Kumar Sharma, who has been working to elevate Varanasi in this challenging time.
He is the person who helped Varanasi cut Covid cases from 1,000+ to under 300. He was also praised and rewarded by Hon’ble PM Modi for his commendable work in the district. At the same time, Sharma offered 53,000 medical kits and other aid to manage CSR funds. He also supported other functionaries of BJP to help the state fight COVID battle. In the time of oxygen crisis in the country, he helped authorities to disseminate alternative medicine in the most affected areas.
If we see Sharma's tweets, we can understand that he was actively circulating leads, helping people arrange the required resources. Presently, along with his official role, he is working to enhance medical facilities in Varanasi and Mau. He is seen to be the brainchild behind the famous 'Kashi COVID response center'.

He also worked with party functionaries with providing the major inputs on mobilizing oxygen as well as medicines in worst-hit areas.
After 20-years of active politics, Sharma has received praise from PM Modi and a more significant responsibility. The largest state, Uttar Pradesh, is expecting an assembly election next year. With this, appointing Sharma as Vice-President of the State unit is not less than a question of life and death.

Took Oath as Cabinet Minister in Uttar Pradesh 
The name of Arvind Kumar Sharma, a former bureaucrat close to PM Narendra Modi, is also included. AK Sharma has got the responsibility of urban development, urban holistic development, urban employment and poverty alleviation, energy and additional energy sources.

References 

Living people
21st-century Indian politicians
People from Mau district
Members of the Uttar Pradesh Legislative Council
Bharatiya Janata Party politicians from Uttar Pradesh
1962 births